Poor Little Sif is a 1927 German silent comedy film directed by Arthur Bergen and starring Paul Wegener, Adele Sandrock, and Jakob Tiedtke.

It was made at the Emelka Studios in Munich. The film's art direction was by Botho Hoefer and August Rinaldi.

Cast

References

Bibliography

External links

1927 films
Films of the Weimar Republic
Films directed by Arthur Bergen
German silent feature films
German black-and-white films
1927 comedy films
German comedy films
Bavaria Film films
Films shot at Bavaria Studios
Silent comedy films
1920s German films